John Dougherty may refer to:
John Dougherty (author) (born 1964), Northern Irish author
John Dougherty (journalist), American investigative journalist
John Dougherty (Missouri politician) (1857–1905), American politician
John Dougherty (Illinois politician) (1806–1879), American politician
John Dougherty (rugby league), Australian rugby league footballer
John Dougherty (bishop) (1932–2022), American prelate of the Roman Catholic Church
John Joseph Dougherty (1907–1986), American prelate of the Roman Catholic Church
Johnny Dougherty, or Johnny Doc, American labor leader and politician

See also
John Doherty (disambiguation)
Jack Daugherty (disambiguation)